Sherman (also Mouth of Little Sandy) is an unincorporated community in northern Jackson County, West Virginia, United States, along the Ohio River.  It lies along West Virginia Route 68 north of the city of Ravenswood.  Its elevation is 600 feet (183 m).

The community was named after the local Sherman family.

See also
List of cities and towns along the Ohio River

References

Unincorporated communities in Jackson County, West Virginia
Unincorporated communities in West Virginia
West Virginia populated places on the Ohio River